"Vroom" is a song by British rapper Yxng Bane. It was released as a single through Disturbing London on 16 March 2018, peaking at number 27 on the UK chart. A remix, featuring Jamaican reggae and dancehall singer Beenie Man, was released on 25 May 2018.

The song was written by Desmond Child, Tarik Collins, Moses Davies, Emmanuel Ezeonyebuchi, Jeremy Harding, Sean Henriques, Guystone Menga, Glenard Patnelli, Troy Rami, Robi Rosa and Gabriel Wood, and produced by Team Salut.

Track listing

Charts

Certifications

References

2018 singles
2018 songs
Yxng Bane songs
Songs written by Desmond Child
Songs written by Sean Paul